Epia is a genus of moths of the family Bombycidae. The genus was erected by Jacob Hübner in 1820.

Selected species
Epia casnonia (Druce, 1887)
Epia domina (Cramer, [1780])
Epia erdae Schaus, 1928
Epia hiemalis Butler, 1878
Epia intricata Druce, 1904
Epia lebethra Druce, 1890
Epia lunilinea Schaus, 1920
Epia madeira Schaus, 1920
Epia muscosa (Butler, 1878)
Epia parsenia Schaus, 1934
Epia picta Schaus, 1920
Epia vulnerata Felder, 1868

Former species
Epia amabilis Barnes & McDunnough, 1918

References

Bombycidae
Moth genera